Yap Rui Chen (born 29 March 1996) is a Malaysian badminton player. She was selected to represent Malaysia at the 2017 Summer Universiade in Taipei, Taiwan.

Career 
Yap plays both singles and doubles. She won her first international title in the Norwegian International. In the same year, she won the Hungarian International Challenge. Yap and her team won a bronze medal at the 2017 Summer Universiade.

In 2022, she participated in the 2022 ASEAN University Games and won a gold medal in the women's team event and a gold in women's doubles.

Achievements

ASEAN University Games 
Women's doubles

BWF International Challenge/Series (2 titles, 1 runners-up) 
Women's singles

  BWF International Challenge tournament
  BWF International Series tournament
  BWF Future Series tournament

References

External links 
 

1996 births
Living people
People from Muar
Malaysian sportspeople of Chinese descent
Malaysian female badminton players
Universiade medalists in badminton
Universiade bronze medalists for Malaysia
Medalists at the 2017 Summer Universiade
21st-century Malaysian women